Grossfeld is a surname. Notable people with the surname include:

 Abie Grossfeld (born 1934), American gymnast and gymnastics coach
 Muriel Grossfeld (1940–2021), American gymnast 
 Norman J. Grossfeld (born 1963), American television producer
 Stan Grossfeld (born 1951), photographer, writer and editor at The Boston Globe